Granger is a surname of English and French origin. It is an occupational name for a farm bailiff. The farm bailiff oversaw the collection of rent and taxes from the barns and storehouses of the lord of the manor. This officer's Anglo-Norman title was grainger, and Old French grangier, which are both derived from the Late Latin granicarius (a derivative of granica, meaning "granary").

People surnamed Granger
Amos P. Granger, U.S. Representative from New York
Ann Granger, British author
A. O. Granger (Arthur Otis Granger; 1846–1914), American industrialist and soldier
Betty Granger, Canadian education figure
Bill Granger, Australian chef
Bradley F. Granger, U.S. Representative from Michigan
Charles Granger (disambiguation)
Charles Granger, Newfoundland politician.
Charles Henry Granger (1812–1893), U.S. artist
Charles T. Granger (1835–1915), judge of the Iowa Supreme Court
Clive Granger, British economist
Daniel L. D. Granger, U.S. Representative from Rhode Island
Danny Granger, U.S. professional basketball player
David Granger (disambiguation)
David A. Granger (born 1945), Guyanese soldier
David Granger (bobsleigh) (1903–2002), U.S. Olympic bobsledder
David Granger (footballer) (born 1955), Australian rules footballer
Dorothy Granger, U.S. actress
Farley Granger, U.S. actor
Flavel K. Granger (1832-1905), U.S. politician and farmer
Francis Granger, U.S. Representative from New York
Geddes Granger, Trinidad and Tobago politician
Gideon Granger, U.S. politician, lawyer
Gilles-Gaston Granger, French philosopher
Gordon Granger, U.S. soldier during the Civil War
Hoyle Granger, U.S. football player
James Granger, British author
Jean-Pierre Granger, French painter
Jedediah W. Granger (1818–1902), American politician in Wisconsin
Jeff Granger, U.S. baseball player
John Granger, U.S. author
Kate Granger, English doctor who started the #hellomynameis campaign
Kay Granger, U.S. Representative from Texas
Keith Granger, English Footballer
Kenneth Granger, New Zealand rugby player
Lester Granger, U.S. civic leader
Mick Granger (born 1931), English professional footballer
Miles T. Granger, U.S. Representative from Connecticut
Oliver Granger, U.S. Latter Day Saint figure
Robert S. Granger (1816–1894), U.S. Army officer
Scotty Granger (born 1987), American singer, songwriter, music producer
Stewart Granger (1913–1993), English actor
Stewart Granger (basketball) (born 1961), Canadian professional basketball player
Tasmeen Granger (born 1994) Zimbabwean cricketer
Thomas Granger (1625–1642), first person hanged in the Massachusetts Bay Colony
Thomas Colpitts Granger (1802–1852), British Radical politician and barrister
Walter K. Granger (1888–1978), U.S. politician
Walter W. Granger (1872–1941), U.S. Vertebrate paleontologist
Wayne Granger (born 1944), American professional baseball player
W. R. Granger (William Rowen Granger; 1873–1925), American-born Canadian sports administrator

Fictional people surnamed Granger
Becky Granger, character on the ITV1 soap opera Coronation Street
Colby Granger, fictional character in the television show Numb3rs.
Granger, Montag's guide outside the city in Fahrenheit 451.
Geraldine Granger, fictional character in the Vicar of Dibley
Hermione Granger, fictional character in J.K. Rowling's Harry Potter.
Hiro Granger, fictional character of the anime and manga series of Beyblade.
Jack Granger, fictional character in the video game Command & Conquer 3: Tiberium Wars.
Lorelei Granger, fictional character in the book Frindle.
Tyson Granger, fictional character of the anime and manga series of Beyblade.
 Granger, fictional character in Mobile Legends: Bang Bang.

People named Granger
Granger (Tourtechot) (c 1680s–1734), French physician and traveller known as Granger, previous name perhaps Tourtechot
Granger K. Costikyan (1907–1998), American banker.

See also 
 Grainger (name)

Notes

English-language surnames
Occupational surnames
Surnames
English-language occupational surnames

ru:Грэнджер